Swizzor is a trojan horse. This Trojan program is a Windows PE EXE file, 62 KB in size.

It has numerous aliases such as:
 DownloaderSwizzor (AVG)
 Trojan-DownloaderWin32Swizzor.cc (Kaspersky Lab)
 TrojanSwizzor (Doctor Web), 
 Troj/Swizzor-CC (Sophos), 
 TROJ_SWIZZOR.CC (Trend Micro), 
 TrojanDownloaderSwizzor.CC (SOFTWIN), 
 Suspect File (Panda), 
 Win32/TrojanDownloaderSwizzor.CC (Eset)
 TR/DldrSwizzorGen (Avira)

The Trojan works by downloading and launching files from the Internet on the infected machine. The trojan is rated as a medium risk.

References

Windows trojans